Handmade is the second album by Jimmy Rankin, released on November 4, 2003.

Track listing

2003 albums
Jimmy Rankin albums
EMI Records albums